Milton Himmelfarb (October 21, 1918 – January 4, 2006) was an American sociographer of the American Jewish community.

Himmelfarb worked for four decades at the American Jewish Committee where he was director of information and research services.  He edited various versions of the American Jewish Yearbook.  He also was a contributing editor of Commentary, the monthly journal of opinion.

In 1986 President Ronald Reagan appointed Himmelfarb to the United States Holocaust Memorial Council. Himmelfarb held several academic posts: visiting professor at the Jewish Theological Seminary and the Reconstructionist Rabbinical College and visiting lecturer at Yale College.  He earned a BA in 1938 and MS in 1939 from City College of New York.

Himmelfarb coined the aphorism on the Jewish community's political persuasions: "Jews earn like Episcopalians, and vote like Puerto Ricans."
Himmelfarb's sister was the historian Gertrude Himmelfarb. He died in New York City at the age of 87. Through Gertrude, he was the uncle of William and Elizabeth Kristol.

Selected works authored, co-authored or edited by Himmelfarb 
 Jews and Gentiles (Encounter Books), 2007,  
 American Jewish Year Book (Jewish Publication Society of America, various years)
 The Jews of Modernity (Basic Books, 1973)
 Jews in Unsecular America: Essays (Eerdmans Publishing Co., 1987)
 Zero Population Growth—For Whom? Differential Fertility and Minority Group Survival (Greenwood Press, 1978)

References

External links
 Archive of Himmelfarb's articles in Commentary

1918 births
2006 deaths
Jewish American social scientists
Jewish sociologists
Jewish Theological Seminary of America faculty
Yale University faculty
City College of New York alumni
American sociologists
20th-century American Jews
21st-century American Jews
Reconstructionist Rabbinical College faculty